Mont de Boisy is a mountain of Haute-Savoie, France. It lies in the Chablais Alps range. It has an altitude of  739 metres above sea level.

Mountains of the Alps
Mountains of Haute-Savoie

Eoikrekoi